The episodes for the twentieth and penultimate season of the anime series Naruto: Shippuden are based on Part II for Masashi Kishimoto's manga series. The season focuses on Naruto Uzumaki, Sasuke Uchiha, Sakura Haruno and Kakashi Hatake attempting to defeat Madara Uchiha and Zetsu, the ones behind the activation of the Infinite Tsukuyomi. There is also anime original episodes featuring characters inside their own Infinite Tsukuyomi dream and a side story revolving around Itachi Uchiha's life in the Leaf Village and his early days in the Akatsuki. The episodes are directed by Hayato Date, and produced by Pierrot and TV Tokyo. The season aired from May 2015 to October 2016.

The season would make its English television debut on Adult Swim's Toonami programming block and premiere on October 16, 2022.

The season contains nine musical themes, including three openings and six endings. The first opening theme,  by Yamazaru, is used from episode 414 to 431. The second opening theme, "LINE" by Sukima Switch, is used from episode 432 to 458. The third opening theme,  by Asian Kung-Fu Generation, is used from episode 459 to 479. The first ending theme,  by sana, is used from episode 414 to 417. The second ending theme,  by FLOW, is used from episode 418 to 431. The third ending theme,  by KANIKAPILA, is used from episode 432 to 443. The fourth ending theme,  by Thinking Dogs, is used from episode 444 to 454. The fifth ending theme,  by Kuroneko Chelsea, is used from episode 455 to 466. The sixth ending theme,  by Huwie Ishizaki, is used from episode 467 to 479.


Episode list

Home releases

Japanese

English

References

General

Specific 
 

2015 Japanese television seasons
2016 Japanese television seasons
Shippuden Season 20